Nikolay Zhukovsky may refer to:

Nikolay Zhukovsky (revolutionary) (1833–1895), Russian revolutionary
Nikolay Zhukovsky (scientist) (1847–1921), Russian scientist

See also
 Zhukovsky (disambiguation)